'Abath al-Aqdar is the first novel by the Egyptian writer Naguib Mahfouz. Originally published in Arabic in 1939, it is Mahfouz's first novel and the first of what would later be referred to as his pharaonic trilogy, which also includes Rhadopis and Thebes at War.

History 
After beginning his literary career in the mid-1930s writing short stories published in Arrissalah, Mahfouz made his foray into writing novels in 1939 with 'Abath al-Aqdar. It's one of several novels that Mahfouz wrote at the beginning of his career with Pharaonic Egypt as the setting, employing what would become his signature historical realism. Rhadopis of Nubia (1943) and Thebes at War (1944) completed Mahfouz's pharaonic trilogy.

Translations 
An English translation of by Raymond Stock published an English translation under the title Khufu's Wisdom in 2003. The complete pharaonic trilogy was published in English in one volume under the title Three Novels of Ancient Egypt (Everyman's Library, 2007).

References

Arabic-language novels
Novels by Naguib Mahfouz
1939 novels
Novels set in ancient Egypt